The Awakening is the third solo studio album by American rapper PMD. It was released on June 17, 2003 via Solid Records. Production was handled by EPMD, DJ Honda, Track Addicts, 7L, Alchemist, DJ Lyve, DJ Muggs, Dre Meezy, the Ghetto Professionals, Ground Work, KutMasta Kurt, Pete Rock and Raheem Solo. It features guest appearances from Don Fu-Quan, 275, Cypress Hill, Fat Joe, Feever, J Boogie, Krazy Drayz, K-Solo, Rah, Rob Jackson, and Erick Sermon, who appeared on the EPMD reunion track "Look At U Now".

The album produced three singles: "Buckwild" b/w "Back To Work", "Straight From Da Heart" b/w "Next Chapter" and "Look at You Now". The song "Know What I Mean" was previously released on PMD and DJ Honda's 2002 collaborative project Underground Connection. Along with PMD's previous solo works — Shadē Business and Bu$ine$$ I$ Bu$ine$$ — it was merged into a double disc compilation album Shade Business / Business Is Business / The Awakening released in 2013.

Track listing

References

External links

2003 albums
PMD (rapper) albums
Albums produced by DJ Honda
Albums produced by DJ Muggs
Albums produced by Pete Rock
Albums produced by Erick Sermon
Albums produced by the Alchemist (musician)